Monte Alegre is a container ship owned by A.P. Moller Singapore Pte. Ltd. and operated by Maersk Line AS. Originally owned by Monte Alegre GmbH & Co KG, a subsidiary of Hamburg Süd, she has had two owners and been registered under two flags.

The vessel is one of ten ships of the Monte class built for Hamburg Süd by Daewoo Shipbuilding & Marine Engineering and Daewoo Mangalia Heavy Industries between 2004 and 2009.

Construction
Monte Alegre had its keel laid down on 22 October 2007 at Daewoo Mangalia Heavy Industries in Mangalia, Romania.

The ship's gross tonnage, a measure of the volume of all its enclosed spaces, is 69,132. Its net tonnage, which measures the volume of the cargo spaces, is 34,823.

The vessel was built with a Doosan Engine Co. Ltd. 8RTA96C main engine, which drives a controllable-pitch propeller. The 8-cylinder engine has a Maximum Continuous Rating of 45,765 kW with 102 revolutions per minute at MCR. The cylinder bore is 960mm. The ship also features 4 main power distribution system HSJ7 907-10F auxiliary generators by Hyundai Heavy Ind. The vessel's steam piping system features an Aalborg CH 8-500 auxiliary boiler.

Construction of the ship was completed on 17 December 2008.

Notes

Merchant ships
2008 ships